Pissing Mare Falls is a tiered waterfall in Gros Morne National Park, Newfoundland, Canada. It is formed from Burnt Woods Brook, which plunges over the edge of Big Level Plateau into Western Brook Pond.

References

External links

Waterfalls of Newfoundland and Labrador